Erin's Isle (Irish: Oileán na hÉireann ) is a Gaelic Athletic Association club in Finglas, Dublin, Ireland. Erin's Isle have won the Dublin Senior Football Championship on two occasions in 1993 and 1997, also capturing the Leinster Club Football Championship in 1997.  The club won the Dublin Juvenile Football Championship for the first time in 1983 and the Dublin Minor Football Championship for the first time in 1985.  Erins Isle won the Dublin Senior Hurling Championship once, in 1983.

Roll of Honour
 Leinster Senior Club Football Championship Winners 1997-98
 Dublin Senior Football Championship Winners (2) 1993, 1997
 Dublin Senior Hurling Championship Winners 1983
 Dublin Senior B Hurling Championship: Winner 2000
 Dublin Junior Football Championship Winners 1953, 2007
 Dublin Under 21 A Football Championship: Winner 1979
 Dublin Under 21 B Football Championship: Winner 2010
 Dublin Under 21 C Football Championship: Winner 2018
 Dublin Minor A Football Championship Winner 1985
 Dublin Senior Football League Division 2  Winners 1982, 2009
 Dublin Senior Hurling League Division 2  Winner 2006
 Dublin Intermediate Hurling League Division 3  Winners 2012, 2017
 Dublin Junior Hurling Championship Winners (3) 1974, 1979, 2017
 Dublin Junior C Hurling Championship Winners 2008
 Dublin Minor A Hurling Championship Winners 1983
 Dublin Minor C Hurling Championship Winners 2014, 2016, 2021
 Dublin Minor Hurling League Division 1  Winners 1997, 1998
 Dublin Senior Camogie Championship Winners 2003
 Dublin Senior B Camogie Championship: Winners 2014
 Dublin Intermediate Camogie Championship: Winners 2020
 Dublin Ladies Junior F Football Championship: Winners 2014
 Dublin Ladies Junior C Football Championship: Winners 2017
 Dublin Ladies Minor C Football Championship: Winners 2018 , 2021

Notable players

Charlie Redmond - Former Dublin player
Mick Deegan - Former Dublin player
P. J. Buckley - Former Dublin player
Ciaran O'Hare- Former Dublin player
Sheamus - WWE wrestler
Louise O'Hara- Former Dublin player
Anne McCluskey- Former Dublin player
Gillian McCluskey- Former Dublin player
Julie Draper- Former Dublin player
Clare Reaney Donohoe- Former Dublin player
John Twomey- Former Dublin player
Thomas Moore- Former Dublin player
Keith Dunne- Former Dublin player
Ryan Mitchell- Current Dublin Minor player
Conor Donohue- Current Dublin Senior Hurling player
Nathan Fitzgerald- Current Dublin Minor player
Senan Clarke- Current Dublin Minor player

References

External links
 
Dublin GAA
Erins Isle Official GAA Website

Finglas
Gaelic games clubs in Dublin (city)
Gaelic football clubs in Dublin (city)
Hurling clubs in Dublin (city)